Daz Productions, Inc. (commonly known as Daz 3D, stylized Daz3D or DAZ 3D in some logos) is a 3D-content and software company specializing in providing rigged 3D human models, associated accessory content, and software to the hobbyist as well as the prosumer market.

Daz 3D has a library of over 5 million assets for Daz Studio and other applications that allow users to create high-quality exportable 3D renders and animations. Daz 3D has continued to focus on 3D-content development, but has also expanded their own software offerings as well, with purchases of several notable 3D applications:

 Bryce, a fractal-based landscape modeler and renderer acquired from Corel by Daz 3D in 2004.
 Hexagon, a 3D mesh modeler originally developed by Eovia, acquired by Daz 3D in 2006.
 Carrara, a general purpose 3D modeler/animation package also acquired from Eovia in 2006.

Additionally, Daz 3D developed their own scene creator software, Daz Studio, as an alternative to Poser.

History 
Originally a part of Zygote Media Group, a general purpose, application-agnostic broker of 3D content, Daz 3D split off as Digital Art Zone in 2000 to focus on supplying content for the Poser market.  The company no longer uses that name, and does not treat "Daz" as an acronym for it.

In 2016, Daz 3D spun off Tafi, a 3D-content company intended to focus more on the game developer market.

Free 3D software
In 2012, Daz 3D shifted their strategy from selling 3D software and content to one of giving the software away for free and focusing more on the selling of the content. This began with offering Daz Studio for free in 2012, which gave customers the ability to render images and video, and expanded in 2017 when Daz 3D added Hexagon to the list of their free software products and added the ability to do 3D modeling to that mix.

Figure technology
Daz 3D has had many versions of its human figures and characters, but in 2011 they launched a significant change in the underlying technology.  Instead of each figure being designed individually, Daz 3D moved to their Genesis platform, in which figures were derived as morphs from the base mesh. Two of the key differences that this technology created were: the ability for characters to be blended into a huge variety of shapes; and, since these shapes were all derived from a common base, add-on content like clothing, hair, and additional morphs would not only work on all characters, but could actually change with the characters.

The Genesis platform has gone through several versions since the launch in 2011:

Genesis 2
One of the shortcomings of the Genesis platform was that although it allowed extremely flexibility in the shape of characters and clothing, it also toned down some of the elements of what made a male or female figure unique.  Genesis 2, released in 2013, changed this by splitting the Genesis base figure into two separate base figures: Genesis 2 Male and Genesis 2 Female.

Genesis 3
Up until Genesis 3, the Genesis figures had been using TriAx Weight Maps, where many other industry platforms were using Dual Quaternion. This changed in Genesis 3, released in 2015, to allow Daz 3D figures to be more compatible with other 3D software platforms as well as Game Development platforms.

Genesis 8
The jump in version naming from Genesis 3 to Genesis 8 was in order to address confusion in naming conventions.  Although Genesis had reached its fourth version, most of the Daz 3D flagship characters were now on their eight versions.  In order to avoid the confusion of Victoria 8 or Michael 8 being Genesis 4 characters, Daz 3D shifted the versioning of Genesis to match with the character versions.

Genesis 8 also included significant changes, including joint and muscle bends and flexing, and facial expressions. This resulted in reduced backward compatibility with previous generations' figures and their content.

Genesis 8.1
Genesis 8.1 allowed users to create realistic characters with emotions for 3D artwork. Genesis 8.1 had improved facial expressions, shader and UV improvements, more depth and realism to eyes, improved detail to mouth areas, and others. Previous characters and animations created in Genesis can be used in Genesis 8.1. However, the 8.1 creations can not be used on any of the other platforms.

Genesis 9
Genesis 9 was released in mid-October 2022

Non-Fungible People 
In January 2022 DAZ 3D minted a NFT collection "Non-Fungible People" featuring 8,888 unique female and non-binary PFP avatars, artistically rendered in a hyper-real style. Packed with utility geared toward the metaverse, NFP avatars can be used almost anywhere that supports 3D characters — including those used in real-time — from popular video game engines to AR and streaming software. Their vision is to help fulfill a diverse and inclusive metaverse.

Features
Daz 3D users are able to build and render realistic 3D models through the Genesis platform. Meanwhile, Daz Studio allows users to create and render 3D scenes by manipulating imported assets.

The Genesis platform allows Daz 3D users to design their own 3D characters using thousands of supported 3D assets such as clothes and accessories.<r

Through the Daz Bridges tool, Daz 3D users can transfer their content to third-party applications, including 3DS Max, Maya, Mudbox, Blender, Cinema 4D, Unity, and Unreal Engine.

Other available Daz Studio features include:

Realistic 3D character morphing technology
dForce physics for simulating natural cloth and hair movement
Backward compatibility for assets created in earlier versions of Genesis
Filament Viewport and Render Engine for faster rendering time
Asset and resource manager

Interface
Daz 3D programs utilize a modular design consisting of panes that enable users to personalize the interface to their preference. When the app launches, users can drag the panes to any location or close them entirely. Panes that have been closed can be reopened by selecting the Panes (Tabs) option from the Window drop-down menu. Additionally, users can customize the layout and design of the interface, from the color scheme to the font.

Resources such as an interactive tutorial, a user guide, and training videos are also provided by the software. Daz Marketplace and Wiki are also accessible through it.

Use
Adding assets to a scene in Daz 3D typically starts with the Smart Content tab, which lets users access Genesis characters, clothing, accessories, environments, and other ready-made assets. Users may also use their own 3D assets by using Import.

Once the asset appears in the viewport, users can customize it in various ways, such as by altering the figure's pose, its placement in the scene, or the clothing it wears. Additionally, they can add new cameras to provide a distinct perspective on their 3D scene, configure the lighting, and animate the characters before rendering.

Content creation
Daz 3D software allows for various kinds of 3D content creation, such as sculpting, sharing, backgrounds, and others.

Sculpting: Daz 3D Hexagon features include sculpted primitives and freehand modeling brushes, which allow users to sculpt detailed 3D models.
Shading: Besides conventional 3D scenes, artistic, cartoon-like renders are also possible through Daz 3D's shaders.
Characters: Daz Studio allows users to create highly configurable 3D character models either from scratch or by importing pre-made or self-created assets.
Costumes: Using the software, users can also design 3D outfits that have realistic materials, rigging, and real-time movement simulations.
Backgrounds: Daz 3D software can also be used to create 3D environments for use as backgrounds in 3D scenes.

Daz Studio

Daz Studio is a free software application developed by Daz 3D to allow users to create 3D scenes and rendering applications that are used to produce images and video. Daz Studio also supports importing and exporting various file formats of 3D objects and animations to use with other 3D content within Daz Studio, as well as to get content out of Daz Studio for use in other 3D applications.

References

External links
Daz 3D official website

Software companies based in Utah
Anatomical simulation
Companies based in Salt Lake City
3D graphics software
Software companies of the United States
2000 establishments in Utah